Changp'ung County is a county in North Hwanghae province, North Korea. Formerly part of the Kaesong urban area, the county was merged with North Hwanghae when Kaesong was demoted in 2003. The county sits northeast of Kaesong city and borders Kumchon, Tosan, Kaesong city, and the Kaesong Industrial Region.

Administrative divisions
The county is divided into one town (ŭp) and 22 villages (ri).

See also
Geography of North Korea
Administrative divisions of North Korea

References

북한네트—중앙일보 - 아시아 첫 인터넷 신문 

Counties of North Hwanghae